Shindler is a German surname that is derived from the German word "schindel" which means "shingle". This suggests that the original bearers of the name were related to the trades of making and installing them. Given the demographics of the name's appearance, it is also possible that Shindler is an anglicization of the German surname "Schindler". Variations and alternate spellings include Schindel and Schindelle.

People with the surname Shindler

Alma Shindler (1879–1964), Viennese-born socialite and composer well known in her youth for her beauty and vivacity
Charlie Shindler, early American homesteader who settled in an area of South Dakota now known as Shindler
Colin Shindler, historian and writer of the 1988 comedy-drama crime film Buster
Conrad Shindler, Revolutionary War veteran of the York County Militia, original owner of the Conrad Shindler House
Geoffrey Shindler, UK (England and Wales) solicitor specialising in Wills, Trusts and Estates law
Mary S. B. Shindler (born 1810), poet of the southern United States
Nicola Shindler (born 1968), British television producer and executive, founder of Red Production Company

Gallery

See also
Schindel
The Conrad Shindler House, historic building, now part of The Historic Shepherdstown Museum, in Shepherdstown, West Virginia
Shindler, South Dakota, unincorporated community in the northeastern corner of Lincoln County, South Dakota, United States